Ra'anan Alexandrowicz (born August 29, 1969, Jerusalem, Israel) is a director, screenwriter and editor. He is known for the documentary The Law in These Parts (2011), for which received the Grand Jury Award at the Sundance Film Festival, a Peabody award, and numerous other prizes. His earlier documentaries, The Inner Tour (2001) and Martin (1999), were shown in the Berlin Film Festival's Forum section and MoMA's New Directors / New Films series. Alexandrowicz's single fiction feature, James' Journey to Jerusalem (2003), premiered in Cannes Directors' Fortnight and at the Toronto International Film Festival and received several international awards. He also directed the 2019 documentary film The Viewing Booth. Alexandrowicz's films have been released theatrically in the United States and Europe, and broadcast by PBS, Arte, the BBC, as well as other television channels. He frequently served as the Sundance Documentary Fund's editing advisor.

Education
Alexandrowicz is a graduate of the Sam Spiegel Film and Television School in Jerusalem. His graduation short film Rak B'Mikrim Bodedim (1966, English title: Self Confidence Ltd) won awards at festivals of Kraków (Bronze Dinosaur Award, "3rd Międzynarodowy Festiwal Filmowy Etiuda&Anima", 13 – 16 November 1996) and Łódź.

Career
In film school, Alexandrowicz focused on fiction filmmaking, but on a trip to a film festival in Germany he met a man named Martin, who had survived the Dachau concentration camp and had remained to live in the town of Dachau for the rest of his life. With simple equipment and a small crew of volunteers, Alexandrowicz filmed the man for a few days that unfolded in an unexpected way. In the two and a half years that followed,  Alexandrowicz looked for a path through the chaotic footage, he developed a passion both for working in nonfiction and for trying to find innovative modes of expression in the documentary form.

In 1999 he released the documentary Martin. The film deals with the discrepancy between memory and commemoration and the disparity between first generation and third generation Holocaust survivors. The film premiered in Jerusalem, where it won the Wolgin Prize, in Berlin, and in New York, and is part of the MOMA permanent collection.

In 1998, Alexandrowicz began to spend time in the Palestinian Occupied Territories and Gaza, doing research for a documentary about the Israeli detention camp for Palestinian political prisoners, K’Ziot. The documentary fell through, but the stories he had heard during his research stayed with him and he began to think about creating a movie that would speak to Israelis about the Palestinian experience and would tell of different perspectives on the Oslo "peace process".

In 2001 he directed the documentary '[https://www.nytimes.com/2002/04/01/movies/film-festival-review-palestinian-tourists-visiting-land-once-familiar-foreign.html The Inner Tour'''], which follows a three-day trip of a group of Palestinians from Israeli territories. Filmed just a few months before the out-break of the second Intifada in 2000, 'The Inner Tour' is a road movie which portrays the story of a group of Palestinians, who join a three day sight-seeing bus tour through the state of Israel. Whether on a beach, in an archaeological site, a historical museum, or a nightclub, the protagonists experience the country they are sight-seeing in a different way than anyone else would. And through these dozens of eyes looking out of the bus windows, a new, unique portrait of Israel is created. Released in the midst of the second Intifada, the film created controversy in Israel but finally was screened on Israeli television. Outside Israel, The Inner Tour was regarded as a rare document of the deepest roots for this painful conflict and was screened in dozens of festivals around the world (Berlin Film Festival, Sundance Film Festival, New Directors/ New Films, Hot Docs and IDFA) and aired on several television channels (Sundance Channel, Arte, BBC).

In 2003 he wrote and directed the full-length feature film James' Journey to Jerusalem in the series "Geography Lesson", that premiered in Cannes' 'Directors’ Fortnight' and at the Toronto International Film Festival and received several international awards. A cannily droll mix of social commentary and modern fable follows the adventures James, a devout wide-eyed young man from the imaginary village of Inchongua attempting a pilgrimage to the Holy Land. Jailed by the immigration authorities upon his arrival in Tel Aviv, this contemporary Candide is miraculously bailed out by a shady small-time businessman only to become part of his migrant labor pool. Undeterred, James perseveres in his religious quest, until he gets a taste of fortune by exploiting his employer's friends and colleagues for his own profit. Alexandrowicz filters an astute exploration of the economic, moral and spiritual hypocrisies of Western society through an evocative portrait of modern Israel's cultural and generational divisions.

Alexandrowicz has an ongoing collaboration with composer and singer Ehud Banai, who won the Ophir Award for music for James' Journey to Jerusalem. He has directed music videos for Ehud Banai.

In 2003 Alexandrowicz joined Taayush, a grassroots volunteer network of Palestinians and Israelis to counter the Israeli nationalist reactions aroused by the Second Intifada. As political activist Alexandrowicz encountered something that had been invisible to him up until then: the existence of a parallel legal system that applies only to Palestinians living under Israeli military occupation since 1967. In his work The Law in These Parts, Alexandrowicz set out to explore the question ‘How can a modern democracy impose a prolonged military occupation on another people while retaining its core democratic values?’. The film is based on over 5 years of research of military court files, which Alexandrowicz translates into film by creating a cinematic courtroom. In a unique studio set-up he brings together interviews with the military judges, heads of the Military Advocate General, headed by Meir Shamgar as a Judge Advocate General in 1967 designed the legal infrastructure of the military rule, images of legal files, and historical footage that show the enactment of these laws upon the Palestinian population.

The film won the Best Documentary Prize, the Van Leer Institute in Jerusalem Film Festival and the Jury Prize for Best Documentary at the Sundance Film Festival. At the Hot Docs Canadian International Documentary Festival, The Law in These Parts won the "Special Jury Prize – International Feature"; in 2013 Alexandrowicz received the Peabody award, and many others more.

In Israel the film had a broad educational audience. It was screened in high schools, police units, to lawyers, public defenders and prosecutors among many others. While on such speaking tours, Alexandrowicz began to wonder about the nature of documentary work that aspires to change reality. In '50 Years of Documentation' (Alexandrowicz, 2018) is an analysis of the unique nature of political documentation with film.The Viewing Booth'' recounts a unique encounter between a filmmaker and a viewer — exploring the way meaning is attributed to non-fiction images in today's day and age. In a lab-like location, Maia Levy, a young Jewish American woman, watches videos portraying life in the occupied West Bank, while verbalizing her thoughts and feelings in real time. Maia is an enthusiastic supporter of Israel, and the images in the videos, depicting Palestinian life under Israeli military rule, contradict some of her deep-seated beliefs. Empathy, anger, embarrassment, innate biases, and healthy curiosity — all play out before our eyes as we watch her watch the images created by the Occupation. As Maia navigates and negotiates the images, which threaten her worldview, she also reflects on the way she sees them. Her candid and immediate reactions form a one-of-a-kind cinematic testimony to the psychology of the viewer in the digital era.

References

External links
 
 PBS Interview

1969 births
Writers from Jerusalem
Israeli filmmakers
Living people
Artists from Jerusalem